Elymus elymoides is a species of wild rye known by the common name squirreltail. This grass is native to most of North America west of the Mississippi River and occurs in a number of ecosystems, from the alpine zone to desert sage scrub to valley grassland.

Description
Its erect solid stems have flat or rolled leaf blades. In contrast, the early-season spike is compact and reddish, as in the images at left.

This grass is considered very good forage for sheep. It is best for grazing during the winter, when it is small and green. It becomes less palatable to livestock when its awns grow long and sharp at maturity.

Economics and competition
The genus Elymus is a part of the Poaceae, the grass family, which is the most economically important plant family to modern human civilization. Evolving 55 million years ago, members of the Poaceae produce wheat, rice, and barley cereal grains. Elymus elymoides (also known as squirreltail) is a specific type of wild rye that experiences competitive forces when introduced to invasive species, such as cheat grass (Bromus tectorum). E. elymoides experiences a decrease in fitness when growing concurrently with B. tectorum, leading to natural selection acting negatively on E. elymoides. This is perhaps best seen in the Great Basin, as the dry environment makes water a limiting resource, resulting in competition over it. B. tectorum'''s advantages may be due to its ability to re-engineer that particular ecosystem's scarce water supply. B. tectorum affects Elymus multisetus similarly, indicating that the trait causing decreased fitness is shared among the entire genus Elymus.

Competition also occurs between E. elymoides and the invasive crested wheatgrass (Agropyron cristatum). When introduced, crested wheatgrass negatively affects mature E. elymoides, despite being able to effectively compete at the seedling stage. If crested wheatgrass is used in rehabilitation or restoration of a site, then co-planting a native bunch grass, such as E. elymoides, may be helpful in preventing a crested wheatgrass monoculture. Because E. elymoides populations decline when introduced to certain populations, squirreltail may benefit more from a monoculture setting. This characteristic is supported by another species, Elymus nutas. However, although it is successful as a monoculture food source, it results in a reduction of carbon transfer and decreased soil health when grown alone. To preserve a prosperous Elymus elymoides food source, one must take into consideration its effects on the soil when grown alone, and its responses to competitive forces if grown with other plants.

Subspecies
Subspecies include:E. e. ssp. brevifolius - widespreadE. e. ssp. californicus - occurs in the western half of the species rangeE. e. ssp. elymoides - widespreadE. e. ssp. hordeoides'' - limited mostly to the Pacific Northwest

References

External links

Jepson Manual Treatment: Elymus elymoides
Elymus elymoides — U.C. Photo gallery

elymoides
Bunchgrasses of North America
Grasses of the United States
Grasses of Canada
Native grasses of the Great Plains region
Native grasses of California
Native grasses of Nebraska
Native grasses of Oklahoma
Native grasses of Texas
Flora of Western Canada
Flora of the Northwestern United States
Flora of the Southwestern United States
North American desert flora
Flora of the Great Basin
Flora of the California desert regions
Flora of the Sonoran Deserts
Flora of Arizona
Flora of Colorado
Flora of Nevada
Flora of New Mexico
Flora of Utah
Flora of Wyoming
Flora of the Cascade Range
Flora of the Klamath Mountains
Flora of the Sierra Nevada (United States)
Natural history of the California chaparral and woodlands
Natural history of the Mojave Desert
Natural history of the Peninsular Ranges
Natural history of the Transverse Ranges
Flora without expected TNC conservation status